Prasenjit Biswas is a Professor of philosophy at North Eastern Hill University, Shillong. His research interests reflect an interdisciplinary orientation that includes ethno-philosophy, ethnicity, and indigenous identities. He is a human rights defender who works with Barak Human Right Protection Committee ( BHRPC), Silchar. The BHRPC defended human rights of labourers and their families in tea gardens of Barak Valley of Assam, who faced deaths due to starvation  in 2011–12. The National Human Rights' Commission of India granted relief and compensation to some of the families who suffered due to starvation deaths. Biswas also contributed to United Nations' fourth Universal Periodic Review (UPR) on Human Rights process initiated by Working Group on Human Rights (WGHR),New Delhi.
Biswas specializes in continental philosophy and phenomenology with an emphasis on Jacques Derrida, Georgio Agamben, Jean Luc-Nancy, Francoise Laruelle etc. He has worked on Post-Marxist thoughts, Non-Philosophy and currently exploring the notion of Aporia in Social Theory. He also draws meaningful parallels between Continental Philosophy and India's locally rooted philosophical traditions from among Tribal communities. Rooted in a Sanskritic tradition of doing Darsana in a family of traditional Indian philosophers, he develops a dialogic interface between heterodox Indian philosophical traditions and European and Continental philosophical world-views. His current works are a return to an interdisciplinary worldview traditions in which he combines a policy paradigm such as India's Act East with Southeast and East Asian traditions from a contemporary Indian philosophical point of view of 'Swaraj in Ideas' and Rabindranath Tagore's Cosmopolitan universalism.
He writes occasionally in The Statesman on issues related to Northeast India and often shares his views in national and international media.

Academic career
Biswas obtained his PhD from North Eastern Hill University. He was formerly with Indian School of Mines, Dhanbad, Indian Institute of Technology Bombay, Indian Institute of Technology Guwahati, and Assam University, Silchar.Presently he hold full professorship at North-Eastern Hill University, Shillong, India since 2011.

Books authored 
Political economy of underdevelopment of North-East India, Akansha Pub. House, 2004 (with Rifual Ahmed).
The Postmodern Controversy: Understanding Richard Rorty, Jacques Derrida and Jurgen Habermas, Rawat Publications, 2005.
Ethnic life-worlds in north-east India: an analysis, New Delhi: Sage, 2008 (with Chandan Suklabaidya).
Construction of Evil in north east India, Sage ( edited with C J Thomas)

Between Philosophy and Anthropology: Aporias of Language, Thought and Consciousness, Notion Press, Chennai, 2017.

Books edited
Peace in India's North-East: Meaning, Metaphor, and Method: Essays of Concern and Commitment, New Delhi: Regency, 2006 (with C. Joshua Thomas) 
 Construction of Evil in North East India: Myth, Narrative and Discourse New Delhi: Sage, 2012 (with C. Joshua Thomas).

Recent articles
 "Phenomenology and Ontology of Humiliation" in Man and Society: A Journal of North-East Studies, Vol.X, Summer, 2013, pp. 180–202.
 "Daya Krishna's 'Presuppositionsless Philosophy': Sublimity as a Source of Value and Knowledge" In Shail Mayaram (ed.) Philosophy as Samvad and swaraj, SAGE, New Delhi, forthcoming, pp. 133–54.
"The Sense of self: Ka Rngiew, Tlawmngaihna and the Art of Not Being Governed" in Journal of Indian Council of Philosophical Research, Oct-Dec 2011, vol.X XVIII, no. 4, pp. 129–167.
"The Inscrutable substance of Ontology" in Sociological Bulletin, 62(1), January–April, 2013, pp. 124–29.
 "Tagore's Nationalism: In Search of a Proper Place of Identity Struggles of India's Northeast" in Journal of Indian Council of Philosophical Research, January–March 2011, vol. XXVIII, no. 1, pp. 115–134.

References

External links
Official website of NEHU http://www.nehu.ac.in/Schools/Humanities/Philosophy/directory.php

https://m.youtube.com/watch?v=lt-KWXX7ugk

21st-century Indian philosophers
Continental philosophers
Living people
North-Eastern Hill University alumni
Indigenous peoples of South Asia
1969 births
Academic staff of the Indian Institute of Technology (Indian School of Mines), Dhanbad